Sebastiano Timpanaro (September 5, 1923 in Parma – November 26, 2000 in Florence) was an Italian classical philologist, essayist, and literary critic. He was also a long-time Marxist who made important contributions to left-wing political causes. He was an atheist.

Bibliography 
 La filologia di Giacomo Leopardi (1955)
 La genesi del metodo del Lachmann (1963)
 Classicismo e illuminismo nell'Ottocento italiano (1965)
 Sul materialismo (1970)
 Il lapsus freudiano: psicanalisi e critica testuale (1974)
 Contributi di filologia e di storia della lingua latina (1978)
 Aspetti e figure della cultura ottocentesca (1980)
 Antileopardiani e neomoderati nella sinistra italiana (1982)
 Il socialismo di Edmondo De Amicis: lettura del "Primo maggio" (1984)
 Per la storia della filologia virgiliana antica (1986)
 La fobia romana e altri scritti su Freud e Meringer, a cura di C.A. Madrignani, ETS (1992)
 La fobia romana e altri scritti su Freud e Meringer, a cura di A. Pagnini, ETS (2006)
 Nuovi contributi di filologia e storia della lingua latina (1994)
 Nuovi studi sul nostro Ottocento (1995)
 Virgilianisti antichi e tradizione indiretta (2001; posthumous)
 Il verde e il rosso: scritti militanti, 1966-2000 (2001; posthumous)

See also
 Giacomo Leopardi
 Karl Lachmann
 Sigmund Freud
 Signorelli parapraxis 
 Edmondo De Amicis
 Rudolf Meringer
 Italian Socialist Party
 Italian Socialist Party of Proletarian Unity

English translations 
 On materialism (Lawrence Garner, tr., 1975)
 The Freudian slip: psychoanalysis and textual criticism (Kate Soper, tr., 1976)
 The genesis of Lachmann's method (Glenn W. Most, ed. and tr., 2005)
 "The Pessimistic Materialism of Giacomo Leopardi". New Left Review; I/116, July–August 1979: 29–50.
 "Considerations of Materialism".  New Left Review; I/85 May/June 1974: 3-22.

Notes

References 
 Per Sebastiano Timpanaro (ITA) [http://www.accademiafiorentina.it)
 Sebastiano Timpanaro Archive (Marxists Internet Archive)
 Library of Congress Online Catalog (bibliographical information)
 Perry Anderson on Sebastiano Timpanaro

1923 births
2000 deaths
Italian atheists
Italian communists
Italian essayists
Italian male writers
Italian literary critics
Italian philologists
Italian Marxist historians
20th-century Italian philosophers
20th-century Italian historians
Male essayists
20th-century essayists
Corresponding Fellows of the British Academy
20th-century philologists